Andy's Man Club is a UK charitable organisation described as "a talking group, a place for men to come together in a safe environment to talk about issues and problems they have faced or are currently facing". It was formed by Luke Ambler and his mother-in-law Elaine after his brother-in-law Andy, killed himself.

The club, with its slogan "it's okay to talk", started in early 2016 in Halifax with a first meeting of nine men. Since then, the group has expanded across the country and by February 2020 had over 800 men attending every week. Each group meeting is led by a volunteer "group facilitator" who has been trained by the organization.

Other similar organisations have come to exist, some with a local focus and others with a national.

In 2021, it earned the Queen's Award for Voluntary Service.

Similar charities
 It's tricky to talk
Talk Club
MenSpeak
Men Walk Talk
Proper Blokes Club’
Man-Down

Locations

Aberdeen
Altrincham
Barnsley
Batley
Beverley
Bradford
Bridlington
Brighouse
Bury
Dewsbury
Doncaster
Dundee
Dunfermline
Edinburgh
Exeter
Glasgow
Glenrothes
Gosport
Grimsby
Halifax Central
Halifax North
Hartlepool
Hebden Bridge
Huddersfield  Ainley Top
Huddersfield  Central
Hull Central
Hull  North
Leeds  East
Leeds  West
Littlehampton
 Manchester
 Newton Abbot
 Oldham
 Perth
Peterborough
Plymouth
Porthcawl
Preston
Rhondda
Rochdale
Rotherham
Scarborough
Sheffield
Southend-on-Sea
Stafford
St. Andrews
Sunderland
Torbay
Wakefield

See also 
 Men's health
 Mental disorders and gender
 Mental health in the United Kingdom

References

Non-profit organisations based in the United Kingdom
Organizations established in 2016
Therapeutic community
Health charities in the United Kingdom
Mental health organisations in the United Kingdom
Suicide prevention